Epizoanthus is a genus of corals belonging to the family Epizoanthidae.

The genus has cosmopolitan distribution.

Species

Species:

Epizoanthus abyssorum 
Epizoanthus ameilictus 
Epizoanthus amerimnus

References

Epizoanthidae
Hexacorallia genera